Albert Watson OBE (born 1942) is a Scottish fashion, celebrity and art photographer. He has shot over 100 covers of Vogue and 40 covers of Rolling Stone magazine since the mid-1970s, and has created major advertising campaigns for clients such as Prada, Chanel and Levis. Watson has also taken some well-known photographs, from the portrait of Steve Jobs that appeared on the cover of his biography, a photo of Alfred Hitchcock holding a plucked goose, and a portrait of a nude Kate Moss taken on her 19th birthday.

Watson's prints of his photography are exhibited in galleries and museums worldwide. Photo District News named him one of the 20 most influential photographers of all time, along with Richard Avedon and Irving Penn, among others. Watson has won numerous honors, including a Lucie Award, a Grammy Award, the Hasselblad Masters Award and three ANDY Awards,. He was awarded The Royal Photographic Society's Centenary Medal and Honorary Fellowship (HonFRPS) in recognition of a sustained, significant contribution to the art of photography in 2010. Queen Elizabeth II awarded Watson an Order of the British Empire (OBE) in June 2015 for 'services to photography'.

Early life
Albert Watson was born in Edinburgh, Scotland, the son of a physical education teacher. He grew up in Penicuik, Midlothian, and attended the Rudolf Steiner School in Edinburgh and Lasswade High School.

He studied graphic design at the Duncan of Jordanstone College of Art and Design in Dundee, and film and television at the Royal College of Art in London. Though blind in one eye since birth, Watson also studied photography as part of his curriculum.

Career 
Watson emigrated in 1970 to the United States, beginning his career in Los Angeles and then moving in 1976 to New York City.

In 1970, Watson moved to the United States with his wife, Elizabeth, who got a job as an elementary school teacher in Los Angeles, where Watson began shooting photos, mostly as a hobby. Later that year, Watson was introduced to an art director at Max Factor, who offered him his first test session, from which the company purchased two images. Watson’s distinctive style garnered the attention of American and European fashion magazines such as Mademoiselle, GQ and Harper’s Bazaar, and he began commuting between Los Angeles and New York. Albert photographed his first celebrity in 1973, a portrait of Alfred Hitchcock holding a dead goose with a ribbon around its neck, for that year's Harper's Bazaars Christmas issue. The image has become one of Watson's most famous portraits on a list that now includes hundreds of well-known photographs of movie stars, rock stars, rappers, supermodels, even President Clinton and Queen Elizabeth II. In 1975, Watson won a Grammy Award for the photography on the cover of the Mason Proffit album "Come and Gone," and in 1976, he landed his first job for Vogue. With his move to New York that same year, his career took off.

In addition to photography for magazines, Watson created the images for hundreds of successful advertising campaigns for major corporations, such as the GAP, Levi’s, Revlon and Chanel, and he has directed more than 100 TV commercials and photographed dozens of posters for major Hollywood movies, such as Kill Bill, Memoirs of a Geisha, and The Da Vinci Code. All the while, Watson has spent much of his time working on personal projects, taking photographs from his travels and interests, from Marrakech to Las Vegas to the Orkney Islands. Much of this work, along with his well-known portraits and fashion photographs, has been shown in museum and gallery shows around the world, and Watson's limited-edition prints have become highly sought after by collectors. In 2007, a large-format Watson print of a Kate Moss photograph taken in 1993 sold at Christie's in London for $108,000, five times the low pre-sale estimate. The art critic Francis Hodgson, in a gallery review of Watson for the Financial Times of London, called the prints "astonishing". Watson is regarded as a master print-maker and has lectured on the subject at numerous venues, including PhotoPlus International Expo in New York, the National Portrait Gallery in London, and Le Recontres de la Photographie Art Festival in Arles, France.

Watson has had numerous solo museum shows around the world, including at the Museum of Modern Art in Milan, Italy; the KunstHausWien in Vienna, Austria; the City Art Centre in Edinburgh; the Fotomuseum in Antwerp, Belgium; the NRW Forum in Düsseldorf, Germany; Fotografiska, in Stockholm, Sweden; the Deichtorhallen in Hamburg, Germany; and the Multimedia Art Museum, Moscow, Russia, among others. Watson was the first Western photographer to be exhibited at the Lianzhou Museum of Photography in Lianzhou, China, with an exhibition in December 2017. Watson’s photographs have also been shown in many group shows at museums, including the National Portrait Gallery in London, the Metropolitan Museum of Art and Brooklyn Museum in New York, the Pushkin Museum of Fine Arts in Moscow, the International Center of Photography in New York, and the Deichtorhallen in Hamburg, Germany. His photographs are included in the permanent collections at the National Portrait Gallery, the Smithsonian, and the Metropolitan Museum of Art.

Watson has published several books, including Cyclops (1994, Little, Brown), Maroc (1998, Rizzoli), "Albert Watson" (2007, Phaidon). Two books were released in the fall of 2010: "UFO: Unified Fashion Objectives," a look at 40 years of selected Watson fashion photographs, and "Strip Search," a two-volume set of hundreds of photographs Watson took in Las Vegas. There is also Kaos (2017, Taschen). In addition, many catalogs of Watson’s photographs have been published for shows, including "The Vienna Album" (2005).

Watson received an honorary degree from the University of Dundee in 1995 and was inducted into the Scottish Fashion Awards Hall of Fame in 2006. His first exhibition in his homeland, Frozen, was held at the City Art Centre of Edinburgh in 2006.

 Exhibitions 
Solo exhibitions2007 rétrospective, Galerie Acte 2, Paris
 Albert Watson, Young Gallery, Brussels, Belgium
 Epic, Guy Hepner Contemporary, Los Angeles, United States
 Frozen, Photo Museum Antwerp, Antwerpen, Belgium
 Haus der Kunst, Wien, Austria
 A Few Portraits, 401 Projects, New York2008 
 Contact, Galería Hartmann, Barcelona, Spain
 Miss Beehayving, Hamiltons, London2009   
 The white rabbit, Fondazione FORMA per la Fotografia, Milan, Italy
 Albert Watson, Camera Work, Berlin
 Best Of – Albert Watson, NRW-Forum Kultur und Wirtschaft, Düsseldorf, Germany2010 
 Albert Watson Hasted Kraeutler, New York City
 Retrospektive – Albert Watson, Flo Peters Gallery, Hamburg, Germany
 UFO – Unified Fashion Objectives, Galería Hartmann, Barcelona, Spain
 Young Gallery, Brussels, Belgium2011 
 Exposed, Galerie Acte 2, Paris
 I observe – Retrospective, Kahmann Gallery, Amsterdam, Netherlands
 Fotografiska Museum, Stockholm, Sweden
 UFO – Unified Fashion Objectives, A.Galerie, Paris
 Vintage Watson, Hamiltons, London2012'''
 Albert Watson in Morocco, Flo Peters Gallery, Hamburg, Germany
 Albert Watson Archive, Izzy Gallery, Toronto, Canada
 Timeless Beauty, C/O Berlin, Berlin
 Camera Work: Color Photography, CWC Gallery, Berlin
 The expression of Identity, St. Moritz Art Masters, St Moritz, Switzerland
 Treat Photographs: Sacpe, Hasteds Krautler Gallery, New York
 Hamilton 'Modern Masters, London
 Icons of tomorrow, Christophe Guye Galerie, Zurich, Switzerland
 Galerie de l'aimance Casblanca, Morocco2013        
 14 Days in Benin, Rautenstrauch Joest Museum, Cologne, Germany
 Visions, Deichtorhallen, Hamburg Germany
 Vintage, Cyclops Hasted Kraeutler Gallery, New York
 Visions, Deichtorhallen, Hamburg, Germany2014 Silver Linings, Young Gallery, Brussels, Belgium
 Classics, Qvale Gallery, Oslo, Norway2015 Roids!, Christophe Guye Galerie, Zurich
 Multimedia Art Museum, Moscow, Russia
 Silver Linings, Izzy Gallery, Toronto, Canada

Group exhibitions2003 Rolling Stones, Camera Work, Berlin2004 Focus : Faces Photography, Monika Mohr Galerie, Hamburg, Germany2005 Property of a Collector, Photographs Do Not Bend Gallery, Dallas, United States2006 
 Summer in the City 06 – Passion for Fashion!, Galerie Wouter van Leeuwen, Amsterdam, Netherlands
 Nudes Photography, Monika Mohr Galerie, Hamburg, Germany2007 
 Individuals: 20 Portraits from the GAP Collection Herb Ritts, Annie Leibovitz, Albert "Watson", National Portrait Gallery, London2008 Fashion – 9 decades of fashion photography, Camera Work, Berlin
 Traum Frauen – 50 Starfotografen zeigen ihre Vision von Schönheit, Haus der Photographie / Deichtorhallen, Hamburg, Germany
 Blind Date Photography, Monika Mohr Galerie, Hamburg, Germany2009 
 Fashion is big, Holden Luntz Gallery, Palm Beach Florida, United States2010 Fashion – the story of a lifetime, The Empty Quarter Gallery, Dubai, United Arab Emirates
 A Positive View – The Third Edition, Somerset House, London
 Colleziona 2010, Fondazione FORMA per la Fotografia, Milan, Italy2011 Traummänner – Starfotografen zeigen ihre Vision vom Ideal, Haus der Photographie / Deichtorhallen, Hamburg, Germany
 Beauty Culture, The Annenberg Space for Photography, Los Angeles, United States2012 Icons of Tomorrow, Christophe Guye Galerie, Zurich, Switzerland
 Timeless beauty, C/O Berlin, Berlin
 Camera Work: Color Photography, Camera Work Gallery, Berlin
 Great photographs: Scape, Hasted kraeutler, New York City
 Modern Masters Hamiltons, London2013                 
 High Art: A Decade of Collectin, the Smithsonian, Washington D.C. United States
 Beauty in the 21st Century, Multimedia Art Museum, Moscow, Russia2014' Coming into Fashion'', Pallais Galliera, Paris

See also
What Do Artists Do All Day?

References

External links

Albert Watson, Watson's site
Albert Watson on ArtNet
Albert Watson, Gazetteer for Scotland
In the catalogue of the German National Library 
 29 September 2005 – 29 January 2006 	
 (11 September 2005) 
Online Gallery presenting Watson´s works

1942 births
Living people
Alumni of the Royal College of Art
Alumni of the University of Dundee
Fashion photographers
Photographers from Edinburgh
People educated at Lasswade High School Centre
Scottish photographers
Waldorf school alumni
People from Penicuik
Scottish emigrants to the United States
Scottish fashion